Grande Fratello 10 was the tenth season of the Italian version of the reality show franchise Big Brother. The show premiered on 26 October 2009 and concluded on 8 March 2010. Alessia Marcuzzi returned as the main host of the show. The winner of the season, Mauro Marin, received a €250,000 grand prize.

Housemates
 On Day 1 (October 26, 2009) 16 housemates entered the Grande Fratello house; that same night potential housemates Luca Magnani and Alessia Giovagnoli lost the chance to enter the house by losing a public vote and the housemates vote, respectively.
 On Day 8 (November 2, 2009), Gabriele, Mauro, and Veronica entered the house followed by Daniele and Mattia on November 23, 2009 (Day 29). 
 Day 43 (December 7, 2009) welcomed Sarah and Dominique. 
 On Day 64 (December 28, 2009), the housemates saw the return of Alessia who was evicted by the male housemates back on Day 1 and the addition of Nicola Pappalepore. 
 On Day 85, Gianluca Bedin entered as the last housemate of the edition.

Housemate Exchange
On December 17, 2009, the Spanish Big Brother Gran Hermano 11 revealed a housemate exchange with another country will take place. It was revealed the exchange will be with Grande Fratello; the decision most likely comes as the television station that programs the Spanish and Italian versions of Big Brother are owned by the same company, Mediaset. On December 29, during the spin-off show of Gran Hermano: El Debate, it was shown to the Gran Hermano housemates that the Italian housemates taking part of the exchange will be Carmela and Massimo; they arrived at the Gran Hermano house on January 3, 2010; that same night it was announced that the Gran Hermano housemates involved in the exchange are Saray and Gerardo. The Gran Hermano housemates arrived the next day in the Grande Fratello house (Day 71) and stayed till January 9 (Day 77). Carmela and Massimo left the Gran Hermano house early January 10 and returned to the Grande Fratello house on January 11 (Day 78) during the eviction show.

Nominations table

Notes
 On launch night there was an uneven number of housemates to enter the house, as a result of this Big brother nominated Alessia and Cristina for eviction immediately. It was up to the male housemates to vote for which they wanted to stay.
 Starting on launch night the public was asked to vote for the housemates they wanted to save from the first round of nominations. Carmela, Daniela, Diletta, Mara, and Tullio received the fewest votes and were the only housemates eligible to be nominated for eviction.
 As Maicol received the most save votes in the public vote, he was given the power to save one person from eviction instead of nominating.
 As new housemates, Gabriele, Mauro and Veronica were automatically immune from eviction.
 Following last week's eviction, the public was asked to vote for the housemates they wanted to save from the second round of nominations. Camila, Cristina, Davide, Giorgio, Mara, and Sabrina received the fewest votes and were the only housemates eligible to be nominated for eviction.
 As Alberto received the most save votes in the public vote, he was given the power to save two people from eviction instead of nominating.
 As Carmela and Maicol received the second and third most save votes in the public vote, they were banned from nominating.
 Davide, Giorgio and Tullio were automatically nominated for eviction by the producers. The producers then chose Diletta to be allowed to save one of the nominees and she chose to save Tullio.
 Following last week's eviction, the public was asked to vote for the housemates they wanted to save from the third round of nominations. Camila, Cristina, Giorgio, Mara, Tullio and Veronica received the fewest votes and were the only housemates eligible to be nominated for eviction.
 As Alberto, Maicol, and Mauro received the most votes to save they were not eligible to nominate.
 Due to the disproportionate ratio of male to female housemates, all the female housemates were given immunity in round six of nominations.
 Following last week's eviction, the public was asked to vote for the housemates they wanted to save from the seventh round of nominations. Diletta, Giorgio, Mara, Marco, and Tullio received the fewest votes and were the only housemates eligible to be nominated for eviction.
 In round seven, the three housemates who received the most nominations would be up for eviction as opposed to the regular two.
 Following the last eviction, the public was asked to vote for the housemates they wanted to save from the seventh round of nominations. Carmen, Cristina, Daniele, Mara, Mattia and Tullio received the fewest votes and were the only housemates eligible to be nominated for eviction.
 In round eight, immune housemates had to nominate one male and one female housemate who was not immune.
 In round nine, the female housemates had to each save one male housemate from possible eviction. Daniele and Marco were the last two male housemates not to be saved which led to a second round of voting by the female housemates, this time to evict. Daniele was evicted but in fact, the public had to vote to either save or evict them.
 Following the last eviction, the public was asked to vote for the housemates they wanted to save from the tenth round of nominations. Carmen, Cristina, Daniele, Giorgio, Mara, Marco and Tullio received the fewest votes and were the only housemates eligible to be nominated for eviction.
 Following the last eviction, the public was asked to vote for the housemates they wanted to save from the eleventh round of nominations. Carmen, Cristina, Dominique, Giorgio,  and Sarah received the fewest votes and were the only housemates eligible to be nominated for eviction.
 Following the last eviction, the public was asked to vote for the housemates they wanted to save from the twelfth round of nominations. Carmen, Cristina, Daniele, Giorgio,  and Marco received the fewest votes and were the only housemates eligible to be nominated for eviction.
 On January 2, 2010, Grande Fratello announced that Alessia and Nicola would be immune from the thirteenth round of nominations. Carmela and Massimo are immune as they are taking part in the Housemate Exchange.
For the fourteenth round of nominations, housemates had to nominate one female and one male housemate. Mauro was given an exemption following a public vote.
For the fifteenth round of nominations, the public voted for their favorite housemate to gain immunity; Mauro won the vote but the housemates were not told of this. Mauro is immune and earned the right to remove a housemate nominated for eviction. Alessia, Sarah, and Veronica received the most nominations, but Mauro decided to save Alessia leaving Sarah and Veronica to face the public vote.
Following Sarah's eviction on Week 13, the sixteenth round of nominations for Week 14 did not take place due to Massimo's ejection that same night. Nominations will presume next week on Week 14 for Week 15.
The public voted for their favourite Housemates. The six housemates with the most votes were immune from the next eviction. Alberto, Carmela, Giorgio, Maicol, Mauro and Veronica received the most public votes and gained immunity. Alberto, Maicol and Mauro were the top three in the public vote and could each save a housemate from being nominated.
For the twentieth round of nominations, the male housemates each had to nominate one female housemate while the female housemates each had to nominate one male housemate.
The Housemates voted for who they wanted to save. Alberto received the most votes and is through to the final. Next, the public voted for who they wanted to save. The male and the female Housemates with the most votes will be saved. Mauro and Cristina received the most votes and are through to the final. Giorgio and Mara are up for eviction.

External links
 Official site 
 World of Big Brother

2009 Italian television seasons
2010 Italian television seasons
10